Omar Figueroa may refer to:

 Omar Figueroa (politician), Belizean politician
 Omar Figueroa Jr., American boxer